Cycle is a 2008 Indian Malayalam film directed by Johny Antony and written by James Albert, starring Vineeth Sreenivasan, Vinu Mohan, Sandhya, Bhama, and Jagathy Sreekumar. The tale is about two friends, Roy (Vineeth Sreenivasan) and Sanju (Vinu Mohan), struggling to make both ends meet with their low salaries, working respectively as a cashier in a private finance company and as a salesman in an electronics goods shop. It was a box office success.

Plot
The film, set at a shopping mall in Kochi as backdrop, is all about a few youngsters, Roy and Sanju and their love interests, Annie and Meenakshy. Long-ignored and mistreated by society for reasons none of theirs, they decide to take matters into their own hands. Roy is an accountant in a private financing company of Kaustubhan, (deftly played with ease and characteristic gags by Jagathy) who pays his staff, the modest of all salaries. Sanju is a desperate cricketer, left out of Ranji team, who is working in the same commercial mall in an electronics shop. Roy has a soft corner for Annie who works as a receptionist in a travel agency in the same complex. And Meenakshy, the daughter of Kaushtubhan, is madly in love, always chasing Sanju.

Sanju and Roy have plenty of household chaos due to poverty. An idyllic New Year eve celebration turns nightmarish when they are subjected to unimaginable terrors and struggle to save lives. Circumstances leave them with no alternatives other than to become robbers. After a thrilling getaway after stealing two crore rupees, this heist movie recounts what else the cycle of life holds for them. With tons of money at their disposal but with powerful elites on their search, they are forced to alter their plans following impending pressures.

Cast

Soundtrack
The film featured a successful soundtrack composed by Mejo Joseph and lyrics penned by Anil Panachooran. It featured 5 songs, out of which 3 were featured in the film.

 "Kanapponnin" - Cicily Abraham, Vineeth Sreenivasan
 "Milky Way" - Luke, Swapna
 "Pattunarnnuvo" - K. S. Chithra, Srinivas
 "Pattunarnnuvo" - K. S. Chithra,
 "Puthiyoreenam" - Karthik, Vineeth Sreenivasan
 "Varnapainkili" - Vineeth Sreenivasan

References

External links
 

2000s Malayalam-language films
2008 films
Films directed by Johny Antony